Zoltán Vasas (born 5 November 1977) is a Hungarian football player who plays for Vecsés FC in the Hungarian second division.

Vasas has previously played for Győri ETO and Zalaegerszegi TE, making a total of 152 appearances in the Hungarian NB I.

References

1977 births
Living people
Hungarian footballers
Sligo Rovers F.C. players
Association football defenders
Győri ETO FC players
Zalaegerszegi TE players
Ferencvárosi TC footballers
MTK Budapest FC players
Expatriate footballers in Slovakia